The Los Angeles Chargers are a professional American football franchise based in the Greater Los Angeles Area. The Chargers compete in the National Football League (NFL) as a member club of the league's American Football Conference (AFC) West division. The club was founded in 1959 by Barron Hilton and played the 1960 season in Los Angeles as part of the American Football League (AFL). In the next season, the Chargers moved to San Diego. In 2017, the Chargers relocated back to the Los Angeles area.

The franchise has experienced three major periods of success.

The Chargers have experienced three notable periods of decline.

The Chargers have been division champions nine times including 2009, all of them in the AFC West. They have been conference champions six times, but only once since the AFL-NFL merger in 1970. As of the end of the 2020 season, the Chargers had played 967 regular and postseason games in 58 seasons, and have appeared in the postseason nineteen times.

Seasons

Footnotes
 As a result of the AFL-NFL merger, the league was broken into two conferences; the AFL teams moved into the American Football Conference.
This season included the Holy Roller game.
The Chargers finished ahead of Oakland in the AFC West based on better net points in division games.
The Chargers finished ahead of the Denver Broncos based on better divisional record.
This game is known as The Epic in Miami.
This game was known as the Freezer Bowl.
The 1982 season was shortened by a strike, so the league was divided up into two conferences instead of its normal divisional alignment.
The strike of 1987 reduced the regular season schedule from 16 to 15 games.

References
General

 
 

Specific

 
Los Angeles Chargers
seasons
Seasons
Events in San Diego
Events in Los Angeles